Chandpur Medical College is a government medical college in Chandpur District, Bangladesh, founded in 2018 and affiliated with Chittagong Medical University. The class of the first batch of 50 students was commenced on January 10, 2019, on its temporary campus of 250 Bed General Hospital, Chandpur.

References

Medical colleges in Bangladesh
Chandpur District
Education in Bangladesh
2018 establishments in Bangladesh
Educational institutions established in 2018